The 1992 Open Clarins was a women's tennis tournament played on outdoor clay courts at the Racing Club de France in Paris, France, and was part of the Tier IV category of the 1992 WTA Tour. It was the sixth and last edition of the tournament and was held from 14 September until 20 September 1992. Sixth-seeded Sandra Cecchini won the singles title, her second at the event after 1989, and earned $27,000 first-prize money.

Finals

Singles

 Sandra Cecchini defeated  Emanuela Zardo 6–2, 6–1
 It was Cecchini's 1st singles title of the year and the 12th of her career.

Doubles

 Sandra Cecchini /  Patricia Tarabini defeated  Rachel McQuillan /  Noëlle van Lottum 7–5, 6–1

References

External links
 ITF tournament edition details
 Tournament draws

Open Clarins
Clarins Open
1992 in Paris
1992 in French tennis